A Timeless Christmas is a Christmas album released in 2006 by Israel & New Breed.

Track listing 
"Nutcracker Overture"
"Everybody Knows"
"Hark" (featuring Matthew Ward)
"O Come"
"Tidings"
"Christmas Worship Medley"
"Least of These" 
"Nutcracker Interlude"
"By Christmas Day" (featuring Marvin Winans)
"Nocturnal Mist" (featuring Marcus Miller) 
"Silent Nocturne" (featuring Lalah Hathaway & Gerald Albright) 
"Sonny Boy Christmas" (featuring Israel Duncan Houghton II)
"Go Tell It
"We Wish You A Timeless Christmas" (featuring CeCe Winans)
"Have Yourself A Merry Little Christmas" (featuring Marvin Winans, CeCe Winans, Matthew Ward, Lalah Hathaway, Daniel Johnson and Gerald Albright)

Israel Houghton albums
2006 Christmas albums
Christmas albums by American artists